Onnie "Lollypop" Jones (November 8, 1897 – August 22, 1954) was an American vaudeville entertainer and comedian who performed for African-American audiences on stage and film in the 1940s.

Born in Madison, Georgia, he worked as a singer, dancer and comedian in vaudeville.  In 1927, he appeared in a traveling revue, Keep Movin'''.  He also performed in nightclubs, including the Dew Drop Inn, in New Orleans.Jeff Hannusch, "The South's Swankiest Night Spot: The Legend of the Dew Drop Inn", IkoIko.com . Retrieved 7 September 2015  He made commercials for Jax Beer, and took the starring role in several low budget 1946 films including Midnight Menace (also known as The Hidden Menace), Lucky Gamblers, and Chicago After Dark. The Hidden Menace, Norton Herrick Center for Motion Picture Studies, University of Miami   In Midnight Menace, Jones plays a version of himself in a 24-minute all-black musical comedy film.  These and many similar films were made on a low budget by the All-American News company in Chicago, and were shown almost exclusively in African-American movie theaters.

Jones died in 1954, following a lengthy illness.

FilmographyLucky Gamblers (1946)Midnight Menace'' (1946)

References

1897 births
1954 deaths
20th-century American comedians
Vaudeville performers
People from Madison, Georgia
African-American male comedians
American male comedians
20th-century African-American people